Outlaw is the name of two different fictional characters appearing in American comic books published by Marvel Comics. The first Outlaw named Nigel Higgins is England's version of Punisher that first appeared in Punisher (vol. 2) #64 and was created by Dan Abnett, Andy Lanning, and Douglas Braithwaite. The second Outlaw named Inez Temple was created by Gail Simone for the series Deadpool and Agent X. She is a mutant with the ability of superhuman strength and an uncanny aptitude with firearms.

Fictional character biography

Nigel Higgins

Nigel Higgins is a man living in England who gets inspired by Punisher's activities that causes him to become the British version of Punisher called Outlaw. At the time when Kingpin planned to use the English channel to gather the European crime families into a united crime syndicate, Outlaw was the main contact for Punisher and Microchip.

During the "Suicide Run" crossover, Outlaw hears about Punisher's death and heads to the United States of America to investigate. When Punisher was found to be alive in the small town of Laastekist, Outlaw got mixed in with every copycat, ally, and villain that were converging on the location.

As part of the "All-New, All-Different Marvel" brand, Outlaw has left the vigilante business upon regretting if he should let bad guys live or not. Upon moving to New Yorkshire, Outlaw assumed the alias of "Neil Hibbs." His normal life was short-lived when he is chosen by Collector to partake in the "Contest of Champions" against his will at the Battlerealm. As part of Collector's team, Outlaw survived every battle. When Collector's right-hand man Maestro of Earth-69413 betrays Collector and takes the Iso-Sphere, Outlaw witnesses this action as Maestro becomes the new ruler of a reassembled Battleworld. Outlaw and the other contestants were defeated by Maestro as the two-presumed dead contestants Stick and Sentry of Earth-1611 appeared to cut Maestro's victory short. Upon getting hold of the Iso-Sphere, Outlaw used its powers to have Maestro contained somewhere, the other contestants to return to whichever place they want, and for the Iso-Sphere to shatter. Upon returning to England with the Earth-616 contestants, Outlaw had also wished for those he had killed to be returned to life. Outlaw then returned to the superhero business where he helps those in need instead of punishing the guilty.

During the Secret Empire storyline, Outlaw appears as a member of the Champions of Europe. The group, alongside Squirrel Girl and Enigma, successfully drives off the violent Hydra forces that had tried to claim Paris, France.

Inez Temple

Inez Temple was born in Texas and as a child she was bullied by other children, who called her Crazy Inez. This nickname still enrages Inez. Due to her mutant strength, she was far stronger than her peers and beat them whenever they bullied her, but her father taught her to be responsible with her powers. She is a descendant of Lance Temple, who was also known as the Wild West gunman The Outlaw Kid.

When she grew up, she became a mercenary, covering her hair with a long, blonde wig and even had breast augmentation surgery. She encountered Deadpool several times and flirted with him, but the two never really got a chance to hit it off. Outlaw was called in as a shooting instructor for Alex Hayden aka Agent X. They were both hired shortly afterwards to steal the Punisher's Colt .45 handguns and despite being competitors, they started a romantic relationship. They failed to steal the Punisher's guns and were locked up in a phone booth minus their weapons and clothes by Castle. The Punisher then killed the people who had sent them. After that Outlaw started to work with Agent X. When Alex announced his plans to set up a special agency for mercenaries, known as Agency X, she had to disappoint him though; her father had taken ill and she went back to Texas to be with him.

She returned after her father died and discovered that in her absence Alex had had an affair with his secretary Sandi Brandenberg. Her rage vanished when she saw that Alex was being attacked by the Black Swan. Black Swan called Outlaw "Crazy Inez" and in a fit of rage, Outlaw punched straight through his torso. This wasn't enough to kill Black Swan though and together with Taskmaster and Sandi, they defeated the Black Swan. Outlaw and Alex continued their relationship (as did Sandi and Taskmaster). She aided Alex Hayden with his mercenary company, Agency X, but with the end of the Agent X series, she disappeared from the limelight.

After Decimation, she was one of the few mutants to retain her powers. Heeding Cyclops's call for sanctuary, Outlaw went to the X-Mansion for protection and ran into Peepers along the way who was on the run from the Sapien League and battling their leader, the Leper Queen. She becomes one of the 198, and was bunking with Magma and Skids. She struck a rather friendly relationship with Magma; listening when Magma complains about Empath always following her and never leaving her alone even in her dreams.

When a group of superheroes known as the New Warriors accidentally blow up a town causing the general public to turn on superheroes and eventually ignite a superhero civil war. Domino, Shatterstar and Caliban break out the 198 and take them to a bunker in the middle of the desert. They get sealed inside with nuclear weapons and are activated for self-detonation. Outside the X-Men get involved with a fight against Bishop and the O*N*E and Domino wants to help them. Lorelei Travis notices that Cyclops is being controlled by Johnny Dee and recounts the story of the first few days at the 198 encampment. Outlaw is then used by Johnny Dee along with other mutants to attack Domino and Shatterstar. After holding Domino at gunpoint, Toad snaps her out of it. They are all freed from the bunker by combined X-Men, Avengers and military forces. Outlaw takes a leadership role throughout the crisis.

Outlaw was later kidnapped, bound and gagged along with Sandi Brandenberg by T-Ray, one of Deadpool's nemeses. Deadpool swiftly rescued them, seemingly killing T-Ray by skewering his head with his sword. The two were reunited with a now-obese Agent X, after being experimented on by HYDRA, and ended up under Deadpool's employ after being tentatively appointed head of Agency X by Hayden. Outlaw and Sandi then joined Weasel to help bring Deadpool and Bob: Agent of HYDRA back to the present day, after Weasel accidentally transported the two to World War II. After they were restored, the two stayed with the Fantastic Four, allegedly to play cards.

After being critically wounded from a fight with the Punisher, Deadpool comes to Outlaw for assistance. She reveals that she and Agent X are no longer in a relationship. Deadpool later returns and remodels her house after it is destroyed during a fight with the Punisher. She then sleeps with Deadpool after seeing that he actually cares for her.

Recently Outlaw has been seen on the mutant island of Utopia. During Second Coming, after the dome is set and the Nimrods arrive, Cyclops gathers mutants, including Inez, and delivers a speech saying that it's everyone's time to fight, today they are all combatants, today they are all X-Men.

Powers and abilities
The Nigel Higgins version of Outlaw has exceptional skills with firearms.

The Inez Temple version of Outlaw has some degree of superhuman strength, the exact limits of which aren't known. However, she can punch through brick walls with ease. The tissues of her body are somewhat more resistant to physical injury than that of an ordinary human. However, she is far from invulnerable and can be injured by weapons composed of conventional materials or with sufficient force, much like an ordinary human. Nonetheless she can withstand high caliber bullets without them penetrating, though she isn't totally impervious to them. In at least one instance after being shot with .45 caliber bullet from a moderate distance, Inez sustained no more injury other than some bruises. If injured, Outlaw is capable of healing herself somewhat faster from minor injuries than an ordinary human. Apart from her mutant powers, Outlaw has exceptional skills with firearms and with a lasso.

Alternate versions

Deadpool Pulp
In re-imagining of Deadpool set during the McCarthy era, the Inez Temple version of Outlaw is a fugitive from the United States after she is accused of stealing atomic bomb equipment.

Deadpool MAX
In this version, Outlaw is an insane asylum patient with dissociative multiple personality disorder with whom Deadpool has a brief relationship. She first poses as a psychiatrist to lure Deadpool there in order to extract his organs for illegal donations at the behest of a hospital doctor, but develops feelings for him and helps him escape. Later on, she reappears as Domino, asking Deadpool to elope with her as she reveals to be pregnant with his baby; however, the pregnancy is soon revealed to be fake and, through the trust of a Deadpool in denial, she assumes an appearance similar to Black Widow under the name "Honey Moon", in which Deadpool has her committed to the asylum again. She is seen later still as a Mrs. Claus-styled dominatrix called "Santa Clawz", with delusions of wanting to destroy Christmas by giving guns to children and forcing other inmates to make the weapons; only all they can do is draw guns on papers, and Deadpool and Bob quickly talk her down again. Her "Outlaw" persona only appears in flashbacks told by Agent X, another inmate whom she trained and asked to go after Bob and Deadpool for the US$10 million bounty on their heads.

In other media

Video games
 The Inez Temple version of Outlaw appears as a member of the S.H.I.E.L.D. team that confronts the Punisher in the final cutscene of the 2009 PlayStation Network game The Punisher: No Mercy.

Film
 While not appearing in person, a life-sized cutout of the Inez Temple version of Outlaw is seen in Deadpool 2, during the scene where Deadpool and Weasel interview the future members of X-Force.

References

External links
 Uncannyxmen.net character bio on Outlaw
 a more detailed look at Outlaw

Characters created by Andy Lanning
Characters created by Dan Abnett
Characters created by Gail Simone
Comics characters introduced in 1992
Comics characters introduced in 2002
Fictional Black British people
Fictional British people
Fictional characters from Texas
Fictional gunfighters in comics
Fictional mercenaries in comics
Fictional outlaws
Fictional people from London
Marvel Comics characters who can move at superhuman speeds
Marvel Comics characters with superhuman strength
Marvel Comics female superheroes
Marvel Comics male superheroes
Marvel Comics mutants
Marvel Comics superheroes
Western (genre) gunfighters
Western (genre) heroes and heroines
Western (genre) outlaws